West Allis is a city in Milwaukee County, Wisconsin, United States. A suburb of Milwaukee, it is part of the Milwaukee metropolitan area. The population was 60,325 at the 2020 census.

History
The name West Allis derives from Edward P. Allis, whose Edward P. Allis Company was a large Milwaukee-area manufacturing firm in the late 19th century. In 1901, the Allis company became Allis-Chalmers, and in 1902 built a large new manufacturing plant west of its existing plant. The locale in which the new plant was constructed was at the time called North Greenfield, and prior to the 1880s had been called Honey Creek. With the building of the western Allis plant, the area was incorporated as the Village of West Allis, and it became the City of West Allis in 1906.

With the presence of Allis-Chalmers, the largest manufacturer in the area, West Allis became the largest suburb of Milwaukee in the early 20th century. After that, West Allis grew quickly. Between 1910 and 1930, its population grew fivefold. After 1965, the Allis-Chalmers company's fortunes had turned. By 1985, Allis-Chalmers' global workforce had shrunk to 13,000 from its peak of 31,000. Allis-Chalmers would then declare bankruptcy in 1987, closing their last Milwaukee office in 1999.  Since then, West Allis has had some success attracting other employers, such as Quad Graphics.

Geography
West Allis is located at  (43.00, −88.02). The upper courses of the Root and Kinnickinnic Rivers flow through the city. 

Climate

Demographics

2010 census
As of the census of 2010, there were 60,411 people, 27,454 households, and 14,601 families living in the city. The racial makeup of the city was 87% White, 3.3% African American, 1.1% Native American, 2.0% Asian, 3.6% from other races, and 2.9% from two or more races. Hispanic or Latino of any race were 9.6% of the population.

There were 27,454 households, of which 25.8% had children under the age of 18 living with them, 36.3% were married couples living together, 11.9% had a female householder with no husband present, 5.0% had a male householder with no wife present, and 46.8% were non-families. 38.6% of all households were made up of individuals, and 13.3% had someone living alone who was 65 years of age or older. The average household size was 2.17 and the average family size was 2.90.

The median age in the city was 37.7 years. 20.5% of residents were under the age of 18; 8.3% were between the ages of 18 and 24; 30.1% were from 25 to 44; 26.5% were from 45 to 64; and 14.6% were 65 years of age or older. The gender makeup of the city was 49.0% male and 51.0% female.

2000 census
As of the census of 2000, there were 61,254 people, 27,604 households, and 15,375 families living in the city. The population density was 5,397.6 people per square mile (2,083.7/km2). There were 28,708 housing units at an average density of 2,529.7 per square mile (976.6/km2). The racial makeup of the city was 94.03% White, 1.34% African American, 0.70% Native American, 1.33% Asian, 0.02% Pacific Islander, 1.18% from other races, and 1.41% from two or more races. Hispanic or Latino of any race were 3.52% of the population.

There were 27,604 households, out of which 25.5% had children under the age of 18 living with them, 41.2% were married couples living together, 10.6% had a female householder with no husband present, and 44.3% were non-families. 37.3% of all households were made up of individuals, and 14.0% had someone living alone who was 65 years of age or older. The average household size was 2.19 and the average family size was 2.92.

In the city, the population was spread out, with 21.5% under the age of 18, 8.4% from 18 to 24, 32.3% from 25 to 44, 20.5% from 45 to 64, and 17.2% who were 65 years of age or older. The median age was 38 years. For every 100 females, there were 93.0 males. For every 100 females age 18 and over, there were 90.0 males.

The median income for a household in the city was $39,394, and the median income for a family was $50,732. Males had a median income of $36,926 versus $26,190 for females. The per capita income for the city was $20,914. About 4.6% of families and 6.5% of the population were below the poverty line, including 9.0% of those under age 18 and 5.6% of those age 65 or over.

Arts and culture
The Wisconsin State Fair Park, which includes the Milwaukee Mile and is the site of the annual Wisconsin State Fair, is located in West Allis.

The West Allis Post Office contains two oil on canvas murals, Wisconsin Wild Flowers – Spring and  Wisconsin Wild Flowers – Autumn, painted in 1943 by Frances Foy. Murals were produced from 1934 to 1943 in the United States through the Section of Painting and Sculpture, later called the Section of Fine Arts, of the Treasury Department.

Candy Cane Lane runs through Oklahoma and Montana Avenues and 92nd to 96th Street. Residents have been creating elaborate Christmas display since 1984, bringing bumper-to-bumper traffic through the streets on December nights. The festive event has raised over $2.2 million for the MACC Fund.

On June 15, 2006, the city celebrated its 100th anniversary. The celebration included a parade, fireworks and a family festival.

Sports

Pettit National Ice Center is one of only two indoor speed skating rinks in the United States.

West Allis is also the location of the Milwaukee Mile, the world's oldest racing facility.

Transportation
West Allis is served by MCTS Routes 18, 28, 44U, 51, 53, 54, 56, 64, 76, and 92.

Interstate 94 and Interstate 41/Interstate 894 also run through the city.

Education
The schools in the West Allis – West Milwaukee School District:
 Franklin Elementary School
 Hoover Elementary School
 Horace Mann Elementary School
 Irving Elementary School
 Jefferson Elementary School
 Longfellow Elementary School
 Madison Elementary School
 Mitchell Elementary School
 Pershing Elementary School
 Walker Elementary School
 Wilson Elementary School
 Frank Lloyd Wright Intermediate School
Lane Intermediate School
 West Milwaukee Intermediate School
 West Allis Central High School
 Nathan Hale High School
 James E. Dottke High School

The Wisconsin Evangelical Lutheran Synod has two grade school in West Allis: 
 Good Shepherd Lutheran School
 Lamb of God Lutheran School

Government
West Allis is represented by Scott L. Fitzgerald (R) in the United States House of Representatives, and by Ron Johnson (R) and Tammy Baldwin (D) in the United States Senate. Tim Carpenter (D) and Dale P. Kooyenga (R) represent West Allis in the Wisconsin State Senate, and Daniel Riemer (D), Sara Rodriguez (D), and Joe Sanfelippo (R) represent West Allis in the Wisconsin State Assembly.

Notable businesses
 Allis-Chalmers, since closed
 Siemens Power Corporation, now on former Allis-Chalmers grounds
 Quad Graphics, printer
 WDJT-TV (Channel 58, CBS), WMLW-TV  (Channel 49, IND), WBME-CD (Channel 41, Me-TV) and WYTU-LD (Channel 63, Telemundo), Weigel Broadcasting stations with studios located on South 60th Street in a former Allis-Chalmers building
 West Allis Speedskating Club

Notable people

 Jared Abbrederis (born 1990), National Football League player
 Arthur J. Balzer (1895–1962), Wisconsin State Representative
 Gary J. Barczak (born 1939), Wisconsin State Representative
 Jeannette Bell (born 1941), former Mayor of West Allis and legislator
 Dave Cieslewicz (born 1959), former Mayor of Madison, Wisconsin
 Jeffrey Dahmer (1960–1994), serial killer
 Terry A. Davis (1969–2018), computer programmer
 Tighe Dombrowski (born 1982), professional soccer player
 Julius Fiege (1861–1918), Wisconsin State Representative
 Michael Gableman (born 1966), lawyer and former Wisconsin Supreme Court justice
 Jerry Golsteyn (born 1954), NFL player
 Jaida Essence Hall, drag queen
 George C. Hinkley (1862–1936), Wisconsin State Representative
 Martin F. Howard (1892–1969), Wisconsin State Representative
 Robert T. Huber (1920–1991), Wisconsin legislator
 Donald J. Hying (born 1963), Roman Catholic bishop
 Jeff Jagodzinski (born 1963), NFL assistant coach
 Dan Jansen (born 1965), world champion speedskater, Olympic gold medalist
 Richard A. Knobloch (1918–2001), U.S. Air Force general
 Brakken Kraker (born 1987), professional Endurance Athlete
 Mehryn Kraker (born 1994), Former WNBA player
 Peter Kraker (born 1956), NFL player
 Mike Krsnich (1931–2011), MLB player
 Rocky Krsnich (1927–2019), MLB player
 Harvey Kuenn (1930–1988), MLB player and manager
 Liberace (1919–1987), entertainer and pianist
 Alex McRae, professional Baseball Pitcher for The Chicago White Sox
 Chellsie Memmel (born 1988), world champion gymnast, 2008 Olympic silver medalist
 James Melka (born 1962), NFL player
 Dawn Miceli, comedian, podcast host, and member of Rasputina (band)
 Delbert Miller, Wisconsin legislator
 Billy Mitchell (1879–1936), distinguished U.S. Army general
 Nick Pearson (born 1979), Olympic athlete, national champion speedskater
 Eugene A. Phalen (1876–1940), Wisconsin legislator
 Gottfried Schloemer (1842–1921), designer of world's first gasoline automobile
 Tony Staskunas (born 1961), Wisconsin legislator
 Owen Turtenwald (born 1989), Hall of Fame "Magic the Gathering" player
 Ricky Wagner (born 1989), Wisconsin Badgers, NFL player
 Jane Wiedlin (born 1958), rhythm guitarist of The Go-Go's, actress
 Tony Willman (1907–1941), professional race car driver
 Jerry L. Wing (1923–1994), Wisconsin businessman and politician
 Gabriel Zophy (1869–1947), Wisconsin politician

See also
 The Family

References

External links

 City of West Allis

 
Cities in Wisconsin
Cities in Milwaukee County, Wisconsin
1902 establishments in Wisconsin
Populated places established in 1902